At the judo competition at the 1976 Summer Olympics, medals were awarded in five weight classes and in the open competition, and was restricted to male judoka only.

Medal summary

Participating nations

Medal table

References

External links
 
 
 Sports123.com

 
1976 Summer Olympics events
O
1976
Judo competitions in Canada